The Mount Logan Wilderness is a 14,650 acre (59 km2) U.S. wilderness area on the Arizona Strip and is part of the Uinkaret Mountains, a small regional range.  It is located about seven miles south of the Mount Trumbull Wilderness.  The wilderness is within the Grand Canyon-Parashant National Monument and is managed by the BLM.

See also
 List of U.S. Wilderness Areas
 List of Arizona Wilderness Areas

External links

 BLM Mt. Logan Site
 Mt. Logan at wilderness.net
 Changes in Ponderosa Pine Forests of the Mount Logan Wilderness (pdf)

Protected areas of the Mojave Desert
Wilderness areas of Arizona
Protected areas of Mohave County, Arizona
Bureau of Land Management areas in Arizona